Geoffrey Morris (8 February 1949 – 16 February 2015) was an English footballer who played for Walsall, Shrewsbury Town, Bangor City, Port Vale, Kidderminster Harriers, and Brisbane Lions (Australia). A winger, he scored 58 goals in 305 league games in an 11-year career in the Football League. He won promotion out of the Fourth Division with Shrewsbury Town in 1974–75.

Career
Born at Great Barr, West Bromwich, Morris began his career in 1964 at Walsall, who finished ninth in the Third Division in 1965–66 under the stewardship of Ray Shaw. He became the youngest player in the club's history when he made his debut against Peterborough United in September 1965 aged 16 years and 218 days. The "Saddlers" then finished 12th in 1966–67 and seventh in 1967–68. New boss Bill Moore took the club to 13th in 1968–69, 12th in 1969–70, 20th in 1970–71, and ninth in 1971–72. Morris left the club after a 17th-place finish in 1972–73. He scored 35 goals in 177 league games at Fellows Park.

He moved on to Maurice Evans's Shrewsbury Town, who were relegated into the Fourth Division in 1973–74, in exchange for George Andrews and £6,000. The "Shrews" then won immediate promotion with a second-place finish in 1974–75 under the stewardship of rookie manager Alan Durban. He scored nine goals in 75 league games at Gay Meadow.

He spent time in the Northern Premier League with Bangor City, before he was signed by Port Vale manager Roy Sproson for a £200 fee in August 1975. He was unable to make an impact for the "Valiants" in the 1975–76 season, making 15 Third Division and two FA Cup appearances, scoring one goal in a 1–1 draw with Brighton & Hove Albion at Vale Park on 6 September.

He was given a free transfer in May 1976 and moved on to Kidderminster Harriers. He helped Harriers to an eighth-place finish in Division One North of the Southern League in 1976–77.

He left Aggborough and moved to Australia to score 13 goals in 38 National Soccer League games for Brisbane Lions in 1977 and 1978.

Later life
Morris died on 16 February 2015 at the Royal Shrewsbury Hospital after a short illness, aged 66. His funeral took place at Shrewsbury Crematorium on 5 March.

Career statistics
Source:

Honours
Shrewsbury Town
Football League Fourth Division second-place promotion: 1974–75

References

1949 births
2015 deaths
Footballers from Birmingham, West Midlands
People from Great Barr
English footballers
Association football wingers
Bangor City F.C. players
Kidderminster Harriers F.C. players
Port Vale F.C. players
Shrewsbury Town F.C. players
Walsall F.C. players
Queensland Lions FC players
English Football League players
Northern Premier League players
Southern Football League players
National Soccer League (Australia) players